Matt Corboy (born June 4, 1973) is an American actor. He has appeared in both films and television series.

Early life
Corboy was born in Honolulu, Hawaii, and grew up there, before leaving to attend Colorado State University, where he earned a degree in business.

Career
Corboy took up acting in 1996, and has appeared in many commercials, films, and had one-time guest roles in television series. His best-known role was on The Shield, where he appeared as Officer Ray Carlson in 17 episodes. In 2011, he played Cousin Ralph in The Descendants, which received widespread critical acclaim and multiple awards including an Academy Award for Best Adapted Screenplay.

While growing up in Hawaii, Corboy would play poker with his friends. His affinity for the game led to him becoming the lead commentator for the Professional Poker Tour in 2006.

In mid–2017, Corboy was cast in the recurring character Jared Preston Jr. on the ABC soap opera General Hospital to help facilitate Rebecca Budig's character Hayden Barnes exit off of the soap.

Personal life
Corboy has been married to Kara McNamara Corboy since August 4, 2001.

Filmography

Film

Television

References

External links
 
 

1973 births
Living people
Poker commentators
Punahou School alumni
Colorado State University alumni
Male actors from Honolulu
American male film actors
20th-century American male actors
21st-century American male actors